Pavlo Virsky Ukrainian National Folk Dance Ensemble (also referred to simply as Virsky) is a Ukrainian dance company based out of Ukraine, notable for its innovative approach to the art form. The ensemble was founded in 1937 by Pavlo Virsky and Mykola Bolotov, and guided by Virsky until his death in 1975. During World War II, Virsky performed for the soldiers at the front. In 1980, the company's artistic direction was overtaken by Myroslav Vantukh, who had been a disciple of Virsky. Virsky's aim is to create dances that embrace historical Ukrainian dance traditions as well as dances that are innovative and forward-moving.

Repertoire

Choreography by Pavlo Virsky 
My Z Ukraine
Povzunets, a Cossack comedy dance
Oi, Pid Vishneiu
Zaporozchi, National Ukrainian dance of Cossacks
Vyshyvalnytsi
Moriaky
Hopak

Choreography by Myroslav Vantukh 
Carpathians
Tambourine Dance
The Years of Youth
In Peace and Harmony
Russian Suite
Ukraino, My Ukraino
Tsygansky, a Gypsy dance
The Volynsk Patterns
Kozachok

See also 
List of folk dance performance groups

References

External links

Official Website of Ukrainian National Folk Dance Ensemble Named After P.Virsky
A News Article on Virsky 
Ukrainian Weekly Article

Folk dance companies
Dance in Ukraine
Soviet performing ensembles
Cultural organizations based in Ukraine